Hisn ibn al-Minhal (variant forms include Hafs and al-Husayn ibn Minhal) was a ninth century governor of the Yemen for the Abbasid Caliphate.

Hisn was appointed as resident governor on behalf of Isa ibn Yazid al-Juludi, when the latter departed the province shortly after the capture of Hamdawayh ibn Ali ibn Isa ibn Mahan in 820. He was eventually succeeded by Ibrahim al-Ifriqi.

Notes

References 
 
 
 

Abbasid governors of Yemen
9th century in Yemen
9th-century Arabs